William A. Foley (William Auguste "Bill" Foley; born 1949) is an American linguist and professor at Columbia University He was previously located at the University of Sydney. He specializes in Papuan and Austronesian languages. Foley developed Role and Reference Grammar in a partnership with Robert Van Valin.

Career 
In 1986, Foley published The Papuan Languages of New Guinea through Cambridge University Press. In 1991, his book The Yimas Language of New Guinea was published by Stanford University Press. In 1997, his book Anthropological Linguistics, "the first comprehensive textbook in anthropological linguistics" was published with an introduction by Noam Chomsky.

Works
 William A. Foley and Robert D. Van Valin, Jr (1984). Functional syntax and universal grammar. Cambridge: Cambridge University Press.
 William A. Foley (1986). The Papuan Languages of New Guinea. Cambridge: Cambridge University Press. . Google Books
 William A. Foley (1991). The Yimas Language of New Guinea. Stanford: Stanford University Press. 
 William A. Foley (1997). Anthropological Linguistics: an introduction. Oxford: Basil Blackwell.
 William A. Foley (2005). "Linguistic prehistory in the Sepik - Ramu basin." In: Andrew Pawley, Robert Attenborough, Robin Hide and Jack Golson, eds, Papuan pasts: cultural, linguistic and biological histories of Papuan-speaking peoples, 109–144. Canberra: Pacific Linguistics.
 
 
 William A.Foley (2022) "A Sketch Grammar of Kopar".  Berlin: De Gruyter Mouton

References

External links
Prof. William A. Foley at the University of Sydney

Linguists from the United States
Linguists of Austronesian languages
Linguists of Southeast Asian languages
Linguists of Papuan languages
Linguists of Lower Sepik languages
Academic staff of the University of Sydney
Living people
1949 births
Paleolinguists
Linguists of Sepik languages